Gouranga Charan Das (1899–1972) was a Gandhian freedom fighter, and leader of the socialist Kissan Movement and Gadajat Praja Andolon in Odisha.

Biography 
Gouranga Charan Das was born in Bagalpur in the then-district of Cuttack (now Jagatshingpur district) in British India on 26 January 1899. He was physically handicapped by birth with his right hand critically crippled. In his early youth he was inspired by Mahatma Gandhi's call and joined the Freedom Movement. He was jailed many times for his participation in the freedom struggle.

He had started his first journey to jails on 13 April 1930 by leading the salt movement at Inchudi. He was imprisoned for more than six years by the British authorities for joining Salt movement, Byakti satygraha and Quit India movement. Quit India movement eighteen freedom fighters from his village Bagalpur were imprisoned and thousands of people joined in the struggle under his leadership. He was deeply involved with Charakha movement. He was one of the stalwart organizers of Congress socialist party with Nabakrushna Choudhuri and Bhagabati Charan Panigrahi. He was the man who made history by changing aristocrat Karans of his village to allow Harijans into the famous Dadhibamanjew temple.

He had been elected uncontested to Orissa Assembly in 1946 and was Chairman of Cuttack Zilla Parishad from 1961 to 1967. Simple in nature but strong in decision, the Legendary Gandhian breathed his last on 19 February 1972. His only son Shashi Bhusan Das was also his fellow traveller and imprisoned in British jail by joining in the freedom movement. Both father and his son had together staked their lives out in cause of the country and had emerged as formidable force against not only the British, but also against the local oppressors that were in nexus with the British.

References 

People from Jagatsinghpur district
1899 births
1972 deaths
Prisoners and detainees of British India
Indian social reformers
Activists from Odisha
People from Cuttack